Harras Heikinheimo (21 September 1914 – 1 March 1999) was a Finnish chess player.

Biography
In the early 1950s Harras Heikinheimo was one of Finland's leading chess players. He played mainly in domestic chess tournaments and Finnish Chess Championships.

Harras Heikinheimo played for Finland in the Chess Olympiad:
 In 1950, at second reserve board in the 9th Chess Olympiad in Dubrovnik (+3, =1, -2).

References

External links

Harras Heikinheimo chess games at 365chess.com

1914 births
1999 deaths
Finnish chess players
Chess Olympiad competitors
20th-century chess players